Makokou Airport  is an airport serving Makokou, Ogooué-Ivindo Province, Gabon.

The Makokou non-directional beacon (Ident: KO) is located on the field.

Airlines and destinations

See also

 List of airports in Gabon
 Transport in Gabon

References

External links
Makokou Airport
OpenStreetMap - Makokou
OurAirports - Makokou

Airports in Gabon